The following is a list of squads for each nation that competed in men's football at the 2012 Summer Olympics in London. Each nation had to submit a squad of 18 players, at least 15 of whom had to be born on or after 1 January 1989; no more than three could be older. A minimum of two goalkeepers (plus one optional dispensation goalkeeper) had to be included in the squad.

Group A

Great Britain
The following is the Great Britain squad in the men's football tournament of the 2012 Summer Olympics.

As part of an agreement with the FA, no players from England's Euro 2012 squad were selected. However, an agreement was made to allow Jack Butland to play on both squads. Butland, a late injury replacement for the Euro 2012 team, did not play in the tournament as England's third goalkeeper, and was allowed to keep his Olympic roster spot.

Coach: Stuart Pearce

* Over-aged player.

Senegal
The following is the Senegal squad in the men's football tournament of the 2012 Summer Olympics.

Coach: Joseph Koto

* Over-aged player.

United Arab Emirates
The following is the United Arab Emirates squad in the men's football tournament of the 2012 Summer Olympics.

Coach: Mahdi Ali

* Over-aged player.

Uruguay
The following is the Uruguay squad in the men's football tournament of the 2012 Summer Olympics.

Coach: Óscar Tabárez

* Over-aged player.

Group B

Gabon
The following is the Gabon squad in the men's football tournament of the 2012 Summer Olympics.

Coach: Claude Albert Mbourounot

* Over-aged player.

Mexico
The following is the Mexico squad in the men's football tournament of the 2012 Summer Olympics.

Coach: Luis Fernando Tena

* Over-aged player.

South Korea
The following is the South Korea roster in the men's football tournament of the 2012 Summer Olympics.

Coach: Hong Myung-bo

* Over-aged player.

Switzerland
The following is the Switzerland squad in the men's football tournament of the 2012 Summer Olympics.

Coach: Pierluigi Tami

* Over-aged player.

Group C

Belarus
The following is the Belarus squad in the men's football tournament of the 2012 Summer Olympics.

Coach: Georgi Kondratiev

* Over-aged player.

Brazil
The following is the Brazil squad in the men's football tournament of the 2012 Summer Olympics.

Coach: Mano Menezes

* Over-aged player.

Egypt
The following is the Egypt squad in the men's football tournament of the 2012 Summer Olympics.

Coach: Hany Ramzy

*Indicates that player was born prior to 1 January 1989. According to FIFA regulations, only three such players are permitted on an Olympic squad.

New Zealand
The following is the New Zealand roster in the men's football tournament of the 2012 Summer Olympics.

Coach:  Neil Emblen

* Over-aged player.

Group D

Honduras
The following is the Honduras squad in the men's football tournament of the 2012 Summer Olympics.

Coach:  Luis Fernando Suárez

* Over-aged player.

Japan
The following is the Japan roster in the men's football tournament of the 2012 Summer Olympics.

Coach: Takashi Sekizuka

* Over-aged player.

Morocco
The following is the Morocco squad in the men's football tournament of the 2012 Summer Olympics.

Coach:  Pim Verbeek

* Over-aged player.

Spain
The following is the Spain squad in the men's football tournament of the 2012 Summer Olympics.

Coach: Luis Milla

* Over-aged player.

See also
 Football at the 2012 Summer Olympics – Women's team squads

Notes

References

2012 Summer Olympics Men's
squads